The Scarlet Frontier is an Australian novel by E. V. Timms. It was the sixth in his Great South Land Saga of novels.

It was set in Southern Queensland.

References

External links
The Scarlet Frontier at AustLit

1953 Australian novels
Novels set in Queensland
Angus & Robertson books